The speckled rail (Coturnicops notatus), also called speckled crake, is a species of bird in subfamily Rallinae of family Rallidae, the rails, gallinules, and coots. It is found in Argentina, Brazil, Guyana, Paraguay, Uruguay, and Venezuela.

Taxonomy and systematics

The speckled rail shares genus Coturnicops with the yellow rail (C. noveboracensis) of North America and Swinhoe's rail (C. exquisitus) of eastern Asia. It is monotypic.

Description

The sexes are alike. Adults have very dark brown plumage with white spots on their upperparts and white bars on their underparts.

Distribution and habitat

The speckled rail's core range is southern Paraguay, southern Brazil, eastern Argentina, and Uruguay. It is also found in Guyana and Venezuela and as a vagrant in Colombia. Undocumented sight records in Bolivia and the Falkland Islands lead the South American Classification Committee of the American Ornithological Society (SACC) to class it as hypothetical in those countries. It primarily inhabits dense marshes, swamps, grassy savanna, and rice and alfalfa fields but is also found in the edges of humid woodland.

Behavior

Movement

Some authors propose that the speckled rail is migratory, breeding in the south and wintering in the north. However, there are many records of birds in Brazil, Paraguay, and Uruguay during the austral winter, and birds in breeding condition have been noted in Venezuela. The SACC does not have breeding records from Guyana but notes it as breeding in the four countries of its core range and in Venezuela.

Feeding

Almost nothing is known about the speckled rail's foraging technique or diet. The latter is known to include grass seeds and arthropods.

Breeding

The speckled rail's breeding season is mostly unknown; in the south it appears to include December and in Venezuela August. Nothing else is known about its breeding biology.

Vocalization

As of late 2022 xeno-canto had no recordings of speckled rail vocalizations and the Cornell Lab of Ornithology's Macaulay Library had only two. The species has a "kooweee-cack" call, a whistled "keeee" alarm call, and a high "kyu" whose purpose is unknown.

Status

The IUCN has assessed the speckled rail as being of Least Concern, though its population size is not known and is believed to be decreasing. No immediate threats have been identified. Records are very sparse; the species is assumed to be hard to find but "until further evidence is forthcoming, [it is] best considered genuinely rare."

References

speckled rail
Birds of South America
Birds of the Pampas
Birds of Argentina
Birds of Paraguay
Birds of the South Region
speckled rail
Taxonomy articles created by Polbot